Tamil Nadu Buildings (Lease and Rent Control) Act, 1960 is act of Government of Tamil Nadu. Tamil Nadu, a state in India, has an exclusive Rent Control Act where the state government has the exclusive jurisdiction to legislate on the subject.

Provisions
 For Residential building, Annual rent can be 6 to 9 per cent of total cost of the building at the time construction.
 For Non Residential building, Annual rent 9 to 12 per cent of total cost of the building at the time construction.
 Maintenance charges can be 10 per cent of the rent.
 Tenant need not pay the owner for property tax.
 Additional 15% rent for a furnished house.

See also
 Tamil Nadu Government Laws & Rules
 Jural relationship

References 

Tamil Nadu state legislation
Housing in Tamil Nadu
Real property law
Landlord–tenant law